Grace Moloney (born 1 March 1993) is a professional footballer who plays as a goalkeeper for FA WSL club Reading. Born in England, she is a member of the Republic of Ireland women's national team.

In 2010 aged 15, Moloney was called up to the Republic of Ireland women's national football team under 15's, later playing for the under 17s and under 19's squads.

In June 2016 Moloney joined Aston Villa on loan.

Early life
Moloney was born on 1 March 1993 in Slough, Berkshire to Bill Moloney. Her paternal grandfather is from County Tipperary and paternal grandmother from County Cavan.

She is a life-long fan of Celtic and  Queens Park Rangers (her family team), a team she moved to from Reading during her youth career, later moving back due to the facilities available to allow her to pursue her sport at an international level. Her father Bill, her self-confessed number one fan, travels to all her international games.

Club career

Moloney played for Reading in the second-division FA WSL 2 during the 2015 FA WSL season. She helped the team win the league and signed a professional contract with the team ahead of the 2016 season in the FAWSL 1. When Reading subsequently signed Mary Earps, Moloney was largely restricted to playing in the FA Women's League Cup. Although she had a good relationship with Earps, Moloney was unhappy about being dropped and joined Aston Villa on loan in June 2016.

In April 2019 Moloney signed a new contract with Reading. She had re-established herself as the first choice goalkeeper and helped the club reach the FA Women's Cup semi-final, which they lost to West Ham United on a penalty shootout. Reading recognised Moloney's 150th appearance for the club with a presentation before a 1–0 2019–20 FA Women's League Cup defeat by West Ham in November 2019. She signed another two-year contract extension with Reading in February 2021.

On 6 March 2022, Moloney made her 200th appearance for Reading.

International career

Youth
In 2010, Moloney was a key member of the Republic of Ireland U-17 squad who were runners-up in the 2010 UEFA Women's Under-17 Championship and quarter-finalists in the 2010 FIFA U-17 Women's World Cup. At the FAI International Football Awards she was named 2011 Under-19 Women's International Player of the Year.

Senior
Moloney was included in the senior Republic of Ireland women's national football team for the first time in August 2010, for a friendly against the Netherlands, followed by 2011 FIFA World Cup qualifying fixtures against Russia and Israel. She returned to the senior squad as the third goalkeeper for the 2014 Cyprus Cup, but had to make a late withdrawal after she injured her back while training with Reading.

On 5 May 2014, Republic of Ireland women's national football team manager Susan Ronan named Moloney in an experimental squad for a friendly against the Basque Country. Moloney replaced Eve Badana at half-time to play the second half of Ireland's 2–0 defeat in Azpeitia, which was not classified as a full international fixture.

Moloney won her first senior cap at the 2016 Cyprus Cup, playing the full match in Ireland's opening 2–0 defeat by Austria. Despite the result, the Football Association of Ireland's website praised Moloney's "assured performance", while she expressed pride and delight at achieving her longstanding ambition of playing for Ireland at senior level. In August 2016 Ronan called up Moloney to a young and predominantly home-based senior squad for a training camp in Wales. She played in the first of two challenge matches against the Welsh hosts, a 0–0 draw at Rodney Parade in Newport.

Colin Bell replaced Sue Ronan as Ireland's coach in February 2017 and he soon installed Marie Hourihan as the long-term goalkeeping successor to Emma Byrne, believing Moloney to be too small. On 9 October 2018, Moloney played in Ireland's 4–0 friendly defeat by Poland in Ostróda, coming on for Hourihan at half-time.

Moloney was given her first competitive appearance in an important UEFA Women's Euro 2022 qualifier against Germany at Tallaght Stadium on 1 December 2020. She won the confidence of coach Vera Pauw due to her improved form at club level with Reading. Despite Ireland's 3–1 defeat Moloney's performance was hailed as "fantastic" by Pauw.

In an interview with RTÉ Sport in April 2021, Moloney confirmed her admiration for Emma Byrne:

Career statistics

Club

Honours

Association football
2011: FAI International Football Awards Under-19 Women's International Player of the Year

References

External links
 Official Twitter page
 
 
 
 Grace Moloney at Football Association of Ireland (FAI)

1993 births
Living people
Reading F.C. Women players
Republic of Ireland women's international footballers
Republic of Ireland women's association footballers
FA Women's National League players
Women's Super League players
English people of Irish descent
Irish people of English descent
Sportspeople from Slough
Women's association football goalkeepers
Aston Villa W.F.C. players
Footballers from Berkshire
Republic of Ireland women's youth international footballers